State Route 377 (SR 377) is a  state highway that travels south-to-north through portions of Lee and Sumter counties in the southwestern part of the U.S. state of Georgia. The roadway was built in the late 1950s and was designated as SR 377 in the mid-1970s.

Route description
SR 377 begins at an intersection with SR 195 in rural Lee County. It heads northwest, and curves to the north-northwest, to an intersection with SR 118, east of Smithville. The route continues to the north-northwest, crossing into Sumter County along the way, and meets its northern terminus, two intersections with US 280/SR 27/SR 30/SR 49, on one-way pairs, in Americus. The highway roughly parallels US 19/SR 3 for nearly its entire length.

SR 377 is not part of the National Highway System, a system of roadways important to the nation's economy, defense, and mobility.

History
The road that would eventually become SR 377 was built between 1957 and 1960, but only between SR 195 and SR 118. By 1966, the road was extended to Americus. By 1976, the entire road was designated as SR 377.

Major intersections

See also

References

External links

 Georgia Roads (Routes 361 - 380)

377
Transportation in Lee County, Georgia
Transportation in Sumter County, Georgia
Americus, Georgia micropolitan area